Jhelum is a city in Pakistan on the banks of the Jhelum River.

Jhelum or Jehlum may also refer to:
 Jhelum District, an administrative division in Punjab, Pakistan surrounding the city of Jhelum
 History of Jhelum, history of the district of Jhelum, surrounding the city of Jhelum, in modern-day Pakistan
 Jhelum River, a tributary of the Indus in northern Pakistan and Indian Kashmir
 Jhelum Tehsil, an administrative sub-division in Punjab, Pakistan surrounding the city of Jhelum
 Jhelum Valley, Pakistan, a valley in Azad Kashmir, Pakistan
 River Jhelum, another name for the Tan Shan River in Hong Kong (China)
 Jhelum, ship, an East Indiaman, which was abandoned by its crew in Stanley Harbour in 1871
 Battle of Jhelum, a battle fought by Alexander the Great in 326 BC against King Porus of the Paurava kingdom on the banks of the river Hydaspes (now known as the Jhelum).
 Battle of Jhelum - Indian Mutiny, a battle in 1857 fought between British East India Company Forces and Mutineers.